In folklore, a Skrat is a mischievous creature often possessing gold and other riches.  Stories about Skrats often revolve around the Skrat being tricked out of its treasure or else the Skrat fooling the treasure seeker by unexpectedly making the treasure disappear.  Skrats can aid farmers with whom they are living, although this is usually at the expense of the farmer's neighbours from whom they steal.

In Scandinavian mythology the Skrat is a form of Myling.  Estonian stories have the Skrat in the form of a dragon.  Skrats can change form and appear as cats, chickens, or even humans.  The Skrat is also found in German and Slovenian folklore.

References 

European legendary creatures